Wimco Nagar Metro station is a Metro railway station on Line 1 Extension of the Chennai Metro. The station is one of the 9 stations in the Phase I northern extension and one of the 26 stations along the Blue Line (Chennai Metro) of the Chennai Metro. The station will serve the neighbourhoods of Wimco Nagar and other northern suburbs of Chennai.

History
The station was inaugurated on 14 February 2021, with the inauguration of the northern extension of Blue line of Phase I.

The station

Structure
Wimco Nagar is an elevated Metro station situated on the Blue Line (Chennai Metro). It is located in the neighbourhood of Tiruvottiyur, about 600 meters off the coast.

Station layout

Depot
With the inauguration of the northern extension of Blue line of Phase I, a depot was planned for the Wimco Nagar metro station. In January 2022, the Chennai Metro Rail Corporation decided to build a new station named "Wimco Nagar Depot" at this depot, located about 500 meters from the station.

Connectivity

Rail
 Wimco Nagar railway station

See also

 Wimco Nagar railway station
 List of Chennai metro stations
 Railway stations in Chennai
 Chennai Mass Rapid Transit System
 Chennai Monorail
 Chennai Suburban Railway
 Transport in Chennai

References

External links
 

 UrbanRail.Net – descriptions of all metro systems in the world, each with a schematic map showing all stations.

Chennai Metro stations
Railway stations in Chennai